The Turku–Toijala railway is a 1,524 mm (5 ft) railway in Finland. Running through the regions of Southwest Finland, Kanta-Häme and Pirkanmaa, it connects the junction stations of Turku and Toijala in the southwest–northeast direction.

History 
Around the time of the completion of the Helsinki–Hämeenlinna railway – the first of its kind in Finland – planning its extensions towards the south to Turku and north to Tampere became relevant. The northern terminus of the former route was subject to debate; in time, the village of Toijala was chosen as a compromise. The two branches were inaugurated at the same time, on 22 June 1876.

Services 
VR Group operates long-distance services with InterCity and Pendolino type rolling stock on the line. All of these services call in Loimaa and Humppila on their route.

References

External links 
 

Railway lines in Finland
5 ft gauge railways in Finland
Railway lines opened in 1876